Ladies Should Listen is a 1934 American comedy film directed by Frank Tuttle and starring Cary Grant, Edward Everett Horton, Frances Drake, and Nydia Westman.

Plot
The switchboard operator Anna Mirelle (Frances Drake) in an apartment building falls in love with businessman Julian De Lussac (Cary Grant), who lives in the building, whom she has gotten to know only over the phone. When she discovers that the man's current girlfriend Marguerite (Rosita Moreno) is actually part of a scheme to swindle him out of an option of a nitrate mine concession in Chile he bought, she devises a plot to save him and expose the con artist, Marguerite's husband Ramon Cintos (Rafael Corio).
 
De Lussac's friend Paul Vernet (Edward Everett Horton), who is in love with millionaire's daughter Susie Flamberg (Nydia Westman), has to face a great jealous rage, as Susie has fallen in love with De Lussac and has brought in her father to force him into marrying her. He will come out of it by giving Vernet a lesson on how he should act with Susie to impress her. De Lussac gets rid of Marguerite and ends up with Anna.

Cast

Cary Grant as Julian De Lussac
Frances Drake as Anna Mirelle
Edward Everett Horton as Paul Vernet
Nydia Westman as Susi Flamberg
Rosita Moreno as Marguerite Cintos
Joseph North  as Butler (as Joe North)
Charles Ray as Henri, the porter
Rafael Corio as Ramon Cintos
George Barbier as Joseph Flamberg
Charles Arnt as Albert, the manservant
 Clara Lou Sheridan (Ann Sheridan) as Adele
Henrietta Burnside as Operator

Reception

The film was poorly received. Wolfe Kaufman of Variety thought that Grant was "brutally miscast", though Rob Wagner of Script announced that he was "particularly pleased" with him, comparing him to Clark Gable in It Happened One Night that year, with his ability to "surprise everyone with his delightful flair for light comedy".

References

Sources

External links 
 
 

1934 films
1930s English-language films
1934 comedy films
American black-and-white films
Films directed by Frank Tuttle
American comedy films
American films based on plays
Paramount Pictures films
1930s American films